The Journal of Strategic Information Systems is a quarterly peer-reviewed academic journal covering management, business, and organizational issues associated with the use of information systems. It was established in December 1991 and is published by Elsevier. The Co-Editors-in-Chief are Guy Gable  (Queensland University of Technology; since 2019) and Yolande E. Chan (Desautels Faculty of Management, McGill University; since 2021).

Abstracting and indexing 
The journal is abstracted and indexed in:

According to the Journal Citation Reports, the journal has a 2016 impact factor of 3.486.

References

External links 

Information systems
Elsevier academic journals
Publications established in 1991
Computer science journals
Information systems journals
English-language journals
Quarterly journals